Seemless is the debut studio album by American hard rock supergroup Seemless.

Track listing

 Intro - 1:55
 Something's Got To Give - 5:05
 The Wanderer - 3:47
 Soft Spoken Sanity - 4:21
 Endless - 4:35
 The Crisis - 2:48
 Lay My Burden Down - 4:26
 War/Peace - 5:55
 In My Time Of Need - 4:42
 All Is Not Lost - 2:13
 In This Life - 5:25
 Maintain (Live at Sirius Studios) - 4:44

Credits
Jesse Leach- vocals
Derek Kerswill- drums
Pete Cortese- guitars
Kevin Schuler- bass
Jeff Fultz- bass (on the track "Maintain" only)

References 

2005 albums
Seemless albums